The Altoona Rams were a minor league baseball club, based in Altoona, Pennsylvania, that existed between 1907 and 1912. The team was founded in 1904 as the Altoona Mountaineers and played under that name until 1907, when the team changed to the Rams moniker. Altoona played in the Tri-State League.

Year-by-year record

Defunct minor league baseball teams
Baseball teams established in 1904
Baseball teams disestablished in 1912
Defunct baseball teams in Pennsylvania
Altoona, Pennsylvania
1904 establishments in Pennsylvania
1912 disestablishments in Pennsylvania
Defunct Tri-State League teams